The Iron Men is an album led by trumpeter Woody Shaw which was recorded in 1977 but not released on the Muse label until 1980. The Iron Men was reissued by Mosaic Records as part of Woody Shaw: The Complete Muse Sessions in 2013.

Reception

Scott Yanow of Allmusic stated, "This is a particularly interesting set by Woody Shaw (not yet reissued on CD) because it teams the trumpeter with the great saxophonist Anthony Braxton and such forward-thinking players as altoist Arthur Blythe, pianist Muhal Richard Abrams, bassist Cecil McBee and drummer Joe Chambers".

Track listing 
All compositions by Woody Shaw, Muhal Richard Abrams and Cecil McBee except as indicated
 "Iron Man" (Eric Dolphy) - 6:30 
 "Jitterbug Waltz" (Fats Waller) - 8:26 
 "Symmetry" (Andrew Hill) - 8:24 
 "Diversion One" - 2:55 
 "Song of Songs" (Shaw) - 13:35 
 "Diversion Two" - 2:52

Personnel 
Woody Shaw - trumpet, cornet (track 2), flugelhorn (track 4 & 6)
Anthony Braxton - clarinet (track 2),  alto saxophone  (track 3), soprano saxophone (track 5)
Arthur Blythe - alto saxophone (track 1 & 5)
Muhal Richard Abrams - piano
Cecil McBee - bass
Joe Chambers (tracks 1 & 3), Victor Lewis (tracks 2 & 5) - drums

References 

Woody Shaw albums
Anthony Braxton albums
1980 albums
Muse Records albums
Albums produced by Michael Cuscuna